Paul J. McGowan (born January 13, 1966) is a former American football linebacker. He was drafted by the Minnesota Vikings 237th overall in the 1988 NFL Draft. He played college football at Florida State.

College career
McGowan played college football at Florida State University. As a senior in 1987 he was an All-American and won the Butkus Award given to the nation's best linebacker.

Professional career

Minnesota Vikings
McGowan was selected with the 237th pick during the 1988 NFL Draft. The Vikings cut McGowan during training camp.

Cleveland Browns
In 1989, the Cleveland Browns signed McGowan, but he was released during the Browns preseason cuts.

Birmingham Fire
McGowan played for the Birmingham Fire of the World Football League during the 1991 and 1992 seasons.

Orlando Predators
In 1993, McGowan played for the Orlando Predators of the Arena Football League. McGowan was twice named to All-Arena Teams.

References

External links

 Nolefan.org bio

1966 births
Living people
American football linebackers
Florida State Seminoles football players
Birmingham Fire players
Orlando Predators players
Minnesota Vikings players
Cleveland Browns players
Players of American football from Florida
Sportspeople from Winter Park, Florida